National Pro Fastpitch (NPF), formerly the Women's Pro Softball League (WPSL), was a professional women's softball league in the United States. The teams battled for the Cowles Cup.

The WPSL was founded in 1997 and folded in 2001; the NPF revived the league in 2004. A new softball league, the Women's Professional Fastpitch (WPF), launched in 2022, and the NPF disbanded.

Teams

Timeline of NPF teams
Current NPF teams in tan
Former NPF members or defunct teams in blue

League history 

On November 21, 2002, WPSL announced a rebranding strategy and official name change to National Pro Fastpitch. Major League Baseball partnered with NPF as its Official Development
Partner as a continuation of MLB's efforts to connect with female athletes and women in general.

As "Official Development Partner" in 2003, Major League Baseball provided introductions to Major League Baseball Clubs, community partners, broadcast partners and to MLB.com.

As part of its long-term sales, marketing and promotional campaign, NPF featured an All-Star Tour in 2003. The tour provided each of the league's expansion team owners with tools to lay the groundwork in their marketplace for the official launch of league play in 2004.

In 2004, the league relaunched with six teams in six markets:  California Sunbirds in Stockton, California; Arizona Heat in Tucson, Arizona; Texas Thunder in Houston, Texas; Akron Racers in Akron, Ohio ; New England Riptide in Lowell, Massachusetts; and NY/NJ Juggernaut in Montclair, New Jersey.

The 2004 season was distinguished by 178 league-wide games, 96 of the best female softball players in the country, the continued support of Major League Baseball as the Official Development Partner of NPF in the category of women's fastpitch softball, NPF playoffs (both best of three series went three games) and the inaugural NPF Championship with the New York/New Jersey Juggernaut capturing the Championship Cowles Cup with a victory over the New England Riptide, fourth-place finisher in the regular season.

Today, there are 5 National Pro Fastpitch teams: the Aussie Peppers, the California Commotion, the Chicago Bandits, the Cleveland Comets, and the Canadian Wild. Each team has about 20 players on roster. The league's main goal is to provide entertainment and to secure fast-pitch as a professional sports for decades to come.

New ownership (2005)
In December 2004, owners of the individual National Pro Fastpitch (NPF) teams announced a plan intended to transition operations of National Pro Fastpitch from the founding Cowles family to an operating group consisting of team owners.

The efforts of the new ownership group in 2005 focused on solidifying broadcast agreements locally and nationally, soliciting sponsorship support, and aligning with national softball associations to bring meaningful competition to each team market and various grassroots events across the country. The group continues to recruit new teams and strengthen team ownership in each market.

The 2005 regular season included 144 games and 23 opponents including six NPF teams, plus women's ASA major teams and international teams such as Canada, Mexico, Russia, Venezuela, China, and Australia. The season concluded the last weekend in August when the Akron Racers beat the Chicago Bandits 5–4 in extra innings to claim the NPF Championship Title.

The Juggernaut joined forces with Telecare to broadcast six games in 2005. Telecare reaches almost a million homes in the Long Island area. Comcast SportsNet Chicago aired seven original broadcasts of Chicago Bandits games in 2005. ESPN2 aired two games during the NPF Championship series. The final game was broadcast on ESPN2 with a very impressive .48 rating.

The Philadelphia Force and the Connecticut Brakettes joined NPF for the 2006 season. The Brakettes, the Akron Racers, the 2005 Regular Season Champions, the Chicago Bandits, the New England Riptide, the Arizona Heat, the Texas Thunder competed in league play during 2006. The New England Riptide defeated the Connecticut Brakettes to become champions.

For the 2007 season, The Texas Thunder moved to Rockford, Illinois to play as the Rockford Thunder. The Connecticut Brakettes left the NPF to return to exclusive amateur status. The Washington Glory was established as a new franchise, picking up many of the former Brakettes' pro players. The Arizona Heat franchise was officially suspended.

Each of the six established NPF teams played an official schedule of 44 games during 2007, including games against non-league opponents that counted in the NPF standings. The Michigan Ice played a more limited schedule as a provisional NPF team. Non-league opponents included Team China, Denso Japan, the Venezuela national team, and the Stratford Brakettes.

The league moved its playoffs to Kimberly, Wisconsin in a double-elimination format.  Washington was the only team in the playoffs to go undefeated and won the championship in the first game on August 26.  Rains on August 24 prevented the first day of competition to be played so all Friday games were played Saturday morning/afternoon and the scheduled Saturday games were pushed later into the evening.  Monica Abbott and Cat Osterman threw no-hitters during the championship weekend.

In 2008, the league saw the addition of four more games as different international opponents appeared on the schedule and every team played in every other league city.  The international opponents included Canada, Venezuela, Chinese Taipei, and Netherlands.  Each team played two home series against two of the four international opponents.

The league also hosted Battle of the Bats throughout the 2008 season.  At every Saturday night home game, or a selected date if a series is not played on a Saturday night, four players from each team were selected to represent a different bat manufacturer in a home-run-hitting contest.  The contest puts manufacturer against manufacturer and player against player in a competition that concluded in Kimberly, Wisconsin as part of the championship weekend.

Contraction and expansion (2009–2021) 
The New England Riptide did not play the 2009 season, citing economic reasons. The Washington Glory folded outright and were replaced by the USSSA Pride.

For 2011, the Diamonds became a traveling team, and the Pride split home games between two new venues.  In 2012, the Diamonds relocated to Charlotte, North Carolina, and became the Carolina Diamonds.  They played in various venues in North Carolina during the 2012 season.

The league announced that the Pennsylvania Rebellion would be added as an expansion team for the 2014 season, receiving the roster of the recently defunct NY/NJ Comets.

In January 2015, the league announced the Dallas Charge as an expansion team for the 2015 season. The Dallas–Fort Worth metroplex-based team will split their home games between the Ballfields at Craig Ranch in McKinney and a ballpark in Arlington.

On October 23, 2015, the NPF announced that the Scrap Yard Dawgs would join the league as an expansion team based in The Woodlands, Texas.

On January 16, 2017, the NPF announced that the ownership of the Pennsylvania Rebellion would be dissolving the team, effective immediately.  All Rebellion players under contract were granted free agency.

On May 2, 2017, NPF announced the addition of an expansion team, Beijing Shougang Eagles.  Its roster is to be populated with members of China women's national softball team and selected American players. For 2017, the home half Beijing's schedule was played in the home venues of the other NPF teams.  Beijing is expected to announce a permanent US home location in the future.

On October 12, 2017, it was reported the Texas Charge would be dissolving, effective immediately.  The NPF did not make an announcement regarding the Charge, but all Charge players under contract were added to the league's transactions page as free agents.

In an arrangement similar to the Beijing Eagles', NPF announced in December 2017 that Softball Australia would be operating a 2018 expansion team, the Aussie Spirit.

On January 28, 2018, the Scrap Yard Dawgs announced via press release they would no longer be affiliated with the NPF. However, the NPF announced they had terminated the franchise on January 29 citing that the team had violated several league operating rules and franchise requirements. The Scrap Yard Dawgs indicated they would continue as an independent team known as Scrap Yard Fastpitch for 2018.
On the same day, Ohio.com reported that the Akron Racers would be replaced by a Chinese team, similar to the Beijing Eagles. However, on February 1, 2018, Akron, instead, changed their name to the Cleveland Comets. The Comets will still be an NPF travel team.

On October 30, 2018, Softball Canada announced that it will be operating an expansion team called the Canadian Wild.

On September 13, 2019, USSSA Pride announced they would not renew their partnership with NPF for the 2020 season, leaving the league after 11 years.

On November 14, 2019, the California Commotion was announced to be an expansion team, representing the league's first presence on the west coast since the 2005 season. The Commotion's first season in the league was scheduled to be in 2020.

Both the 2020 and 2021 seasons were cancelled due to the COVID-19 pandemic.

On August 1, 2021, the league announced that, due to a lack of revenue after cancelling the previous two seasons, it would be suspending operations.

Champions

Career leaders
 Stats updated . Also note that every listed player was active for at least three seasons of play, while every pitcher also reached 200 innings pitched.

Batting

Pitching

History of previous leagues

IWPSA 
The NPF traces its origins back to the first professional softball league. Former LPGA Tour member Janie Blaylock, softball legend Joan Joyce, tennis icon Billie Jean King, sports entrepreneur Jim Jorgensen and Dennis Murphy co-founder of the WHA and WTT leagues, founded the International Women's Professional Softball Association (IWPSA) in 1976. The league featured 10 teams in cities across the nation, including Meriden, Connecticut, Chicago, Illinois, Prescott, Arizona, and San Jose, California.  In the IWPSA's first season, each team played a 120-game schedule that featured 60 doubleheaders.

The fledgling association survived four seasons before lack of funds, high travel costs, and inadequate facilities ultimately led to its demise.

Teams 
 Arizona/Phoenix Bird (1976)
 Buffalo Breskis (1976–79)
 Chicago Bandits (1976)
 Connecticut Falcons (1976–79)
 Michigan Travelers (1976)
 Pennsylvania Liberties (1976)
 Santa Ana Lionettes (1976–77)
 San Diego Sandpipers (1976)
 San Jose Sunbirds (1976–78); San Jose Rainbows (1979)
 Southern California Gems (1976)
 Bakersfield Aggies (1977)
 St. Louis Hummers (1977–79)
 Edmonton Snowbirds (1979)
 New York Adventurers (1979)

Championships 
1976
Champion: Connecticut Falcons
Runner-up: San Jose Sunbirds

1977
Champion: Connecticut Falcons
Runner-up: Santa Anna Lionettes

1978
Champion: Connecticut Falcons
Runner-up: St. Louis Hummers

1979
Champion: Connecticut Falcons
Runner-up: St. Louis Hummers

Following the IWPSA 
In 1982, the National Collegiate Athletic Association began to sanction the Women's College World Series, a move that led to increased participation and exposure for the sport.

Internationally, the USA Softball Women's national team won back-to-back gold medals at the 1986 ISF Women's World Championship and the 1987 Pan American Games. The college game also benefited from rule changes enacted in 1987 that increased the game's offensive output and ultimately its popularity.

Women's Professional Softball League 
Former Utah State University softball player Jane Cowles and her collegiate coach, John Horan, developed a plan for a women's professional fastpitch softball league. In February 1989, Cowles introduced a blueprint for the league to her parents Sage and John Cowles, Jr., owners of the Cowles Media Company, who agreed to provide financial backing for the endeavor.

Field research and market studies began later that fall and continued to take place into 1993. In January 1994, plans for a barnstorming tour were announced, and 18 months later two teams, the Blaze and the Storm, composed of former collegiate all-stars played exhibition games in cities throughout the Midwest. Eight years of research and planning finally culminated in May 1997, with the Cowles family and title sponsor AT&T Wireless Services launching Women's Pro Fastpitch (WPF). The League began with six teams: Orlando Wahoos, Tampa Bay Firestix, Georgia Pride (later the Akron-based Ohio Pride), Carolina Diamonds, Durham Dragons, and Virginia Roadsters.

WPF Championships

After completing two seasons as WPF, officials changed the name to the Women's Professional Softball League in 1998. The Orlando Wahoos moved to Akron, Ohio and become the Akron Racers, the only team which still remains in the league today.

The WPSL consisted of four teams located in the Eastern United States in 2000. The world's most talented fastpitch softball players, including former Olympians, collegiate All-Americans, and all-conference selections highlighted the 15-player rosters of the league's four squads. The Akron Racers, Florida Wahoos, Ohio Pride, and the Tampa Bay FireStix each participated in the WPSL regular season. The Florida Wahoos defeated the Ohio Pride in the championship series held in Springfield, Missouri.

The 2001 "Tour of Fastpitch Champions" allowed the WPSL to focus on expansion. The 2001 tour traveled to 11 cities that were targeted as WPSL expansion candidates. Competition featured games between the WPSL Gold and All-Star teams as well as Canada, the USA National Teams, and local all-star teams. Nine of these games were televised, seven on ESPN2 and two "live" on ESPN, a first for the WPSL. The season was deemed a success with more than three million households witnessing a WPSL game. Numerous cities are also being developed for future ownership in the league.

Play was suspended during the 2002 season to restructure the organization and allow the league additional time to develop and explore new expansion markets. However, a WPSL All-Star team competed in two exhibition games against the Tennessee All-Stars as part of the National Softball Association's A division Eastern World Series in Chattanooga, Tennessee. The WPSL All-Stars also conducted two clinics as part of the weekend activities.

WPSL Championships

See also 
 List of current National Pro Fastpitch team rosters
 Men's professional softball in the United States
Women's sports

References

Notes

External links 
 
 Japan Pro Softball: Toyota
 The Softball Channel

 
Softball competitions
Professional sports leagues in the United States
2004 establishments in the United States
Sports leagues established in 2004
Sports leagues disestablished in 2021